The Nugush (Nuguš; , Nögöş), also known as the Bolshoy Nugush (Boljšoj Nuguš), is a river in Bashkortostan in Russia, a right tributary of the Belaya. The Nugush freezes up in the first half of November and remains icebound until the second half of April.

Nugush water reservoir storage

References

External links 
 On the river Nugush: distance to Nugush, extent, nature

Rivers of Bashkortostan